is a Japanese sprinter.

He finished fourth in the 200 m at the 2011 World Youth Championships in Athletics.

Personal bests

Records
200 metres
Former Japanese youth best holder - 20.82 s (wind: 0.0 m/s) (Nagoya, 23 October 2011)
4 × 100 m relay
Current Asian and Japanese junior record holder - 39.01 s (relay leg: 2nd) (Barcelona, 13 July 2012)
Current Japanese high school record holder - 39.16 s (relay leg: 2nd) (Fukuroi, 3 May 2012)
4 × 200 m relay
Current Japanese and Japanese university record holder - 1:22.12 s (relay leg: 1st) (Yokohama, 14 September 2014)
Medley relay (100m×200m×300m×400m)
Former Japanese youth best holder - 1:50.69 s (relay leg: 2nd) (Lille, 10 July 2011)

 with Kazuma Ōseto, Asuka Cambridge, and Kazuki Kanamori
 with Kazuma Ōseto, Tatsurō Suwa, and Kazuki Kanamori
 with Yūki Takeshita, Shōtarō Aikyō, and Hiroyuki Mihara
 with Kazuma Ōseto, Shōtarō Aikyō, and Takuya Fukunaga

International competition record

References

External links

1994 births
Living people
Japanese male sprinters
21st-century Japanese people